Plounéour-Brignogan-Plages is a commune in the department of Finistère, western France. The municipality was established on 1 January 2017 by merger of the former communes of Brignogan-Plages (the seat) and Plounéour-Trez.

See also 
Communes of the Finistère department

References 

Communes of Finistère

Communes nouvelles of Finistère
Populated places established in 2017
2017 establishments in France